The Law Commission Act 2009 (c 14) is an Act of the Parliament of the United Kingdom. It amends the Law Commissions Act 1965. Its purpose is to compel the Government to provide, through the Lord Chancellor, the reasoning for any decision that it makes not to implement any proposal of the Law Commission. Lord Kingsland described this as forcing the Government to "put up or shut up about Law Commission proposals".

Section 1 - Reports on implementation of Law Commission proposals
This section inserted a new section 3A into the Law Commissions Act 1965.

Section 2 - Protocol about the Law Commission's work
This section inserted a new section 3B into the Law Commissions Act 1965.

Section 3 - Commencement and short title
Section 3(1) provides that the Act came into force at the end of the period of two months that began on the date on which it was passed. The word "months" means calendar months. The day (that is to say, 12 November 2009) on which the Act was passed (that is to say, received royal assent) is included in the period of two months. This means that the Act came into force on 12 January 2010.

Section 3(2) authorises the citation of the Act by a short title.

References
Halsbury's Statutes,

External links
The Law Commission Act 2009, as amended from the National Archives.
The Law Commission Act 2009, as originally enacted from the National Archives.
Explanatory notes to the Law Commission Act 2009.

United Kingdom Acts of Parliament 2009